Winfield Scott Kerr (June 23, 1852 – September 11, 1917) was an American lawyer and politician who served three terms as a U.S. Representative from Ohio from 1895 to 1901.

Early life and career 
Born in Monroe, Ohio, Kerr attended the common schools of his native city.
He was graduated from the law department of the University of Michigan at Ann Arbor in 1879.
He was admitted to the bar the same year and commenced practice in Mansfield, Ohio.
He served as member of the State senate 1888-1892.

Congress 
Kerr was elected as a Republican to the Fifty-fourth, Fifty-fifth, and Fifty-sixth Congresses (March 4, 1895 – March 3, 1901).
He served as chairman of the Committee on Patents (Fifty-sixth Congress).

Later career and death 
He was an unsuccessful candidate for renomination in 1900.
He resumed the practice of his profession in Mansfield, Ohio, and died there September 11, 1917.
He was interred in Mansfield Cemetery.

Sources

1852 births
1917 deaths
People from Monroe, Ohio
Politicians from Mansfield, Ohio
Ohio lawyers
University of Michigan Law School alumni
Republican Party Ohio state senators
19th-century American politicians
19th-century American lawyers
Republican Party members of the United States House of Representatives from Ohio